Nguyễn Văn Biển (born 27 April 1985 in Nam Định) is a retired Vietnamese footballer who played as a centre back or right back for V.League club Hà Nội F.C. and the Vietnamese national team.

International career

International goals

Honours

Club
Hà Nội F.C.
 V.League 1: 2013, 2016; runners-up: 2011, 2012, 2014, 2015; third place: 2017
 Vietnamese Super Cup runners-up: 2013, 2015, 2016
 Vietnamese National Cup runners-up: 2012, 2015, 2016
 AFC Cup quarter-finals: 2014

References 

1985 births
Living people
People from Nam Định province
Vietnamese footballers
Association football defenders
V.League 1 players
Hanoi FC players
Vietnam international footballers
Footballers at the 2006 Asian Games
Asian Games competitors for Vietnam